Priscilla Guthrie joined the Office of the Director of National Intelligence (ODNI) as the Intelligence Community (IC) Chief Information Officer on May 26, 2009. She was previously Director of the Information Technology and Systems Division of the Institute for Defense Analyses, a non-profit corporation that administers three federally funded research and development centers to provide objective analyses of national security issues. From 2001 to 2006, she served as Deputy Assistant Secretary of Defense (Deputy Chief Information Officer) at the Department of Defense, where she was responsible for information support to deployed forces. Prior to her position at the Pentagon, Ms. Guthrie was a Vice President of TRW Inc., where she established and led a small, global unit responsible for driving new IT technology into the company's business. She also served in several other positions at TRW, Inc. during her career. Ms. Guthrie holds a B.S. from Pennsylvania State University and an M.B.A. from Marymount College.

She resigned as IC-CIO on November 19, 2010.

References

External links
ODNI press release
Pennsylvania State University bio

Obama administration personnel
Living people
Year of birth missing (living people)
United States Department of Defense officials
Chief information officers
Pennsylvania State University alumni